Fire and Rain is a 1989 American made-for-television disaster film directed by Jerry J. Jameson, starring Charles Haid, Angie Dickinson, and Tom Bosley, as well as an all-star ensemble television cast in supporting roles. It is based on the Delta Air Lines Flight 191 plane crash at Dallas/Fort Worth International Airport on August 2, 1985, as depicted in Fire and Rain: A Tragedy in American Aviation (1986) by Jerome Greer Chandler.

Jerry J. Jameson had become known for his work on "movie-of-the-week phenomenon and group-jeopardy suspense and terror", although he also became a specialist in "one-off" television and film features. The film was an example of the aviation "disaster" film, as well, it also very much fits the additional genre of the complex, heavily character-driven ensemble cast film, exploring the personal dramas and interactions that develop among the passengers and crew as they deal with a deadly onboard emergency. It, however, veers from the traditional format as it is based on a real-life accident. It originally debuted on the USA television network.

Plot
 
On August 2, 1985, Delta Airlines Flight 191 a Lockheed L-1011 flown by Captain Connors (John Beck) and First Officer Rudy Price (Dick Christie) is preparing to land at Dallas/Fort Worth International Airport on its single stop, flying from Fort Lauderdale, Florida to Los Angeles via Dallas Fort Worth. Air Traffic controllers advise that a thunderstorm is present. The flight crew surmise that the plane might get washed, but have no other worries about the storm being so near. Passengers such as Lucille Jacobson (Patti LaBelle), who is terrified of flying, however, are fearful about landing in a storm. Others, like Marilyn (Gloria Hocking) and Mike Steinberg (Joe Berryman) are thinking more about their California vacation. As the rain pelts down on the plane, there is no warning of an impending crisis.

Without warning, the L-1011 is slammed into the ground, a mile short of the runway, slicing into a small car on the road, killing William Mayberry (Rudy Young), before skidding onto the field and exploding. Within a minute, all airport fire and emergency units are alerted.  Five minutes into the rescue, first responders Jack Ayers (Dean Jones), Beth Mancini (Angie Dickinson), led by Bob Sonnamaker (Charles Haid) are rapidly deployed to the scene. The severed rear section of the plane is where most survivors are found although flight attendants at the front also survive.

Cast
 
 Charles Haid as Bob Sonnamaker 
 Angie Dickinson as Beth Mancini
 Tom Bosley as Derryl Price
 Robert Guillaume as Carter Guthrie
 Susan Ruttan as Sandra Thompson
 John Beck as Captain Connors
 Dean Jones as Jack Ayers
 Dick Christie as First Officer Rudy Price
 Penny Fuller as Peggy Hamilton
 David Hasselhoff as Dr. Dan Meyer
 Patti LaBelle as Lucille Jacobson
 Lawrence Pressman as Paul Hamilton
 Joe Berryman as Michael Steinberg
 Gloria Hocking as Marilyn Steinberg

 Blue Deckert as Jim Rodman
 L. Gregg Loso as Clint Smith
 Marianne Rogers as Wanda
 Angie Bolling as Helen Smith/Sally Howard
 Jerry Young as Christopher Meier
 Rudy Young as William Mayberry
 Annie Biggs as Terri Mayberry
 Desi Doyen as Susan Anderson
 Gary Moody as Charles Petty
 Vernon Grote as Rescue Worker
 Macaulay Bruton as Rabbi
 Norma Harris Gordon as Amy Hughes
 Patricia Zehentmayr as herself
 Phil Shirey as Lead Person

Production

Filmed at Dallas-Fort Worth International Airport, the film was a docudrama that recreated the events of August 2, 1985, when Delta Airlines Flight 191, a Lockheed L-1011-385-1 TriStar airliner flying from Fort Lauderdale, Florida to Los Angeles was coming into Dallas/Fort Worth International Airport on its single stop on the route.  It unexpectedly flew into an isolated thunderstorm hovering very close to the field. The storm created a dangerous "wind shear", or "microburst", dashing it into the ground just slightly more than a mile north of the outer perimeter.

The film incorporated the true-life stories of many of the 152 passengers and 11 crew members on board. In the end, 137 died and 28 survived; one other person on the ground was also killed. The prologue to the film indicated that the crash was one of the worst aircraft mishaps in U.S. history. Up to that time, the circumstances behind it regarding microbursts and wind shears of the kind that brought it down, as well as the kind of thunderstorm that caused them, were unknown. Subsequently, the investigation and review of procedures led to modifications in all big-body civil aircraft whereby their radar could detect the anomalies of major storm systems. At the time, it could only detect the actual presence of the storm itself. A groundbreaking legal action also resulted.

Many firefighters and emergency personnel were portrayed by real first responders from the Dallas-Fort Worth Metroplex. Some of them had been on duty during the actual rescue following the crash, and were, in effect, portraying themselves.

In popular culture
The crash of Delta Flight 191 was not only the subject of the film. It was also featured on an episode of When Weather Changed History on The Weather Channel, and the episode "Deadly Weather" of Survival in the Sky.  The television series Mayday (aka Air Crash Investigation or Air Emergency) on Discovery Channel Canada and National Geographic dramatized it in the episode "Invisible Killer" (aka "Slammed to the Ground"). It was also shown and discussed in a later Mayday episode about the American Airlines Flight 1420 accident, which also occurred during landing in bad weather conditions.

References

Notes

Citations

Bibliography

 Birtles, Phillip. Lockheed L-1011 TriStar (Airliner Color History). St. Paul: Minnesota: Motorbooks International, 1998. .
 Chandler, Jerome Greer. Fire and Rain: A Tragedy in American Aviation. Austin, Texas: Texas Monthly Press, 1986. .
 Roberts, Jerry. Encyclopedia of Television Film Directors. Lanham, Maryland: Scarecrow Press, 2009. .

External links
 
 

1989 television films
1989 films
1980s disaster films
1989 crime drama films
American aviation films
American disaster films
Disaster films based on actual events
Disaster television films
Drama films based on actual events
American drama television films
Films about aviation accidents or incidents
Films about death
Films directed by Jerry Jameson
Films scored by Artie Kane
Films set in 1985
Films set on airplanes
1980s English-language films
1980s American films